Enniskillen/St Angelo Airport  is located  north of Enniskillen, County Fermanagh, Northern Ireland. Enniskillen/St Angelo Aerodrome has a CAA Ordinary Licence (Number P875) that allows flights for the public transport of passengers or for flying instruction as authorised by the licensee (Enniskillen Airport Limited).

First built and used during World War II as RAF St Angelo and later renamed St Angelo Barracks while in use as a British Army base, the airfield has been in private ownership as a civilian airport since 1996. The original two runways were reduced to one following the development of the main Enniskillen to Kesh road.

Scheduled passenger flights have, in the past, operated from this airport, but these have ceased since 2006. There are a number of companies based at the Airport offering a wide range of flying and aircraft related services.

History

A Royal Air Force station 

The airfield was originally established in April 1941 as a relief landing ground (RLG) for RAF Aldergrove. Later that year on 15 September RAF St Angelo opened as a fighter sector station in its own right, operating Spitfires and Hurricanes to intercept enemy reconnaissance aircraft off the west coast of Ireland and in the air defence role over Belfast.

In 1943 the station also became home to several squadrons of Catalina and Sunderland flying boats operating from Lough Erne. Later that year, Bristol Beaufighters were based at St Angelo during anti-submarine patrols in the Irish Sea and over the Atlantic Ocean. As the level of operations over Northern Ireland wound down in 1944 No. 12 (Operational) Flying Instructor School was established at both Killadeas and St Angelo and remained until February 1945, when the school was relocated to RAF Turnberry in Scotland.

Between the end of the war and February 1947 St Angelo was home to No. 272 Maintenance Unit RAF and served as a storage and dismantling depot for mothballed Avro Ansons prior to their eventual sale or disposal.

Use by the army 
The station later became a centre of helicopter operations over Northern Ireland when St Angelo was transferred to the Army and used as an accommodation barracks for the Ulster Defence Regiment and other British Army regiments during The Troubles in the province, with most personnel housed in a vast array of temporary portacabins.

The military use of St Angelo came to a close in March 1996 when the temporary accommodation buildings were demolished, since when St Angelo airfield has been in use as a civilian facility.

Airfield services 
Enniskillen Airport is the host venue for Heli Challenge: The Premier Helicopter Championship. Heli Challenge is an international competition, which tests the skill of some of the best helicopter pilots from across the British Isles. Enniskillen Airport has hosted Heli Challenge in 2009 & 2011.

Unique Helicopters are a helicopter training and hire company offering pleasure flights from St Angelo Enniskillen Airport.

At Enniskillen airport there are two helicopter maintenance facilities.

References

External links

 Amphibious flying club

Airports in Northern Ireland
Enniskillen
Buildings and structures in County Fermanagh
1941 establishments in Northern Ireland